Netzwerk is the first studio album by the electronic band Klangkarussell. It was released in 2014 through Vertigo Records.

Track listing

Notes
The UK track listing changes the places of tracks 5 and 11
Tracks 1 and 8 translate to "Ice Tea in a Can" and "Star Children"
Sample credits
"Netzwerk (Falls Like Rain)" and "Netzwerk" samples elements from "Madan" by Salif Keita
"Celebrate" interpolates elements from the composition "I Just Want to Celebrate" by Rare Earth
"Sternenkinder" incorporates elements of "Makings of a Cyborg" as composed by Kenji Kawai from the Ghost in the Shell original soundtrack
Track 4 is a remix of the 2003 song "We Want Your Soul" by Adam Freeland; originally released as We Want Your Soul (Klangkarussell Remix)

Charts

Weekly charts

Year-end charts

Release history

References

2014 debut albums
Vertigo Records albums
Capitol Records albums
Universal Music Group albums
Klangkarussell albums
European Border Breakers Award-winning albums